In Greek mythology, Agaptolemus (Ancient Greek: Ἀγαπτόλεμος) was an Egyptian prince as one of the sons of King Aegyptus.

Family 
Agaptolemus's mother was a Phoenician woman and thus full brother of Cercetes, Eurydamas, Aegius, Argius, Archelaus and Menemachus. In some accounts, he could be a son of Aegyptus either by Eurryroe, daughter of the river-god Nilus, or Isaie, daughter of King Agenor of Tyre.

Mythology 
Agaptolemus suffered the same fate as his other brothers, save Lynceus, when they were slain on their wedding night by their wives who obeyed the command of their father King Danaus of Libya. He married the Danaid Pirene, daughter of Danaus and an Ethiopian woman.

Notes

References 

 Apollodorus, The Library with an English Translation by Sir James George Frazer, F.B.A., F.R.S. in 2 Volumes, Cambridge, MA, Harvard University Press; London, William Heinemann Ltd. 1921. ISBN 0-674-99135-4. Online version at the Perseus Digital Library. Greek text available from the same website.
 Tzetzes, John, Book of Histories, Book VII-VIII translated by Vasiliki Dogani from the original Greek of T. Kiessling's edition of 1826. Online version at theio.com

Princes in Greek mythology
Sons of Aegyptus
Phoenician characters in Greek mythology